El Harti Stadium is a multi-use stadium in Marrakech, Morocco.  It is used mostly for football matches and athletics and hosted the home games of Kawkab Marrakech.  The stadium holds 25,000 people.  It was replaced by Stade de Marrakech in 2012.

References

Football venues in Morocco
E
Buildings and structures in Marrakesh